Tommaso Reato (born 12 May 1984) is an Italian rugby union player.

Reato was born in Rovigo, and plays for Rugby Rovigo in the Top12. Reato's position of choice is at Lock.

He was called up to the Italy squad for the 2008 Six Nations Championship.

References

External links
RBS 6 Nations profile

1984 births
Living people
Italian rugby union players
Italy international rugby union players
Rugby union locks